Magnus von Horn, (born 21 December 1983, Gothenburg), is a Swedish film director and screenwriter. He graduated from the National Film School in Łódź in 2013. A few months after he arrived in Poland he was brutally robbed, which resulted in him becoming interested in violent people. His first film was a short documentary about a young Polish criminal. His 2011 short film Without Snow was nominated for the Guldbagge Award for Best Short Film. His debut feature, The Here After, premiered in the Directors' Fortnight of the 2015 Cannes Film Festival.

Filmography
 Radek (2006) – short documentary
 Mleczaki (2007) – short
 Echo (2008) – short
 Without Snow (Utan snö) (2011) – short
 The Here After (Efterskalv) (2015)
 Sweat (2020)

References

External links

Polsko-szwedzki film "Intruz" jedzie do Cannes! (in Polish)

1983 births
Living people
Łódź Film School alumni
People from Gothenburg
Swedish film directors
Swedish screenwriters
Swedish male screenwriters
Best Director Guldbagge Award winners